Ab Gavan may refer to:
 Ab Gavan-e Bozorg
 Ab Gavan-e Kuchek